Roberto Maytín and Fernando Romboli were the defending champions but chose not to defend their title.

Ruben Gonzales and Treat Huey won the title after defeating Wu Tung-lin and Zhang Zhizhen 7–6(7–3), 6–4 in the final.

Seeds

Draw

References

External links
 Main draw

Savannah Challenger - Doubles
2022 Doubles